Cabreraea is a genus of flowering plants belonging to the family Asteraceae. It contains a single species, Cabreraea andina.

Its native range is Northwestern Argentina.

References

Astereae
Monotypic Asteraceae genera